Joy Katz (b Newark, New Jersey) is an American poet who was awarded a 2011 National Endowment for the Arts Fellowship for Poetry.

She is the author of three poetry collections, most recently All You Do Is Perceive, a National Poetry Series finalist (Four Way Books, 2013), The Garden Room (Tupelo Press, 2006), and Fabulae (Southern Illinois University, 2002). Her work appears in Ploughshares, Gulf Coast,Conduit, Barrow Street, Colorado Review, Court Green, and Verse, Slope, The New York Times Book Review, Parnassus, and Prairie Schooner. Katz was raised in Buffalo; Philadelphia; Camden, Maine; and Cincinnati. She earned a B.S. at Ohio State University, an MFA at Washington University in St. Louis, and she held a Stegner Fellowship at Stanford University. Katz is an editor-at-large at Pleiades.  She teaches poetry workshops at the Chatham University MFA Program in Creative Writing. She married a playwright, Rob Handel, on May 28, 2005, and lives in Pittsburgh.

Honors and awards
 2011 National Endowment for the Arts Fellowship for Poetry
 2005 Tupelo Press Snowbound Chapbook Prize
 2001 Crab Orchard Award
 Stegner Fellowship at Stanford University
 Nadja Aisenberg Fellow at the MacDowell Colony

Published works
Full-length poetry collections

Chapbooks

Anthology publications
 
 

Anthologies edited

Review
Don't expect the narratives in Joy Katz's first book to resolve themselves into tidy morals. There's nothing Aesopian about Fabulae. A glance at my Latin dictionary suggests that a more apt translation of the title is "myths," for these unsettling poems conceal and reveal insights more spiritual and unpredictable than aphoristic. They resist easy expectations.

References

External links
 Poem: electronic poetry review 3 > A desk chai by Joy Katz
 Poem: electronic poetry review 3 > ''Color of the walls by Joy Katz
 Poem: electronic poetry review 3 > How I feel about topiary by Joy Katz

1963 births
Living people
Writers from Newark, New Jersey
Poets from New Jersey
Poets from New York (state)
Ohio State University alumni
Washington University in St. Louis alumni
Stanford University alumni
The New School faculty
Chatham University faculty
American women poets